The Miss Perú 1968 pageant was held on June 19, 1968. That year, 21 candidates were competing for the national crown. The chosen winners represented Peru at the Miss Universe 1968, and Miss World 1968. The rest of the finalists would enter in different pageants.

Placements

Special Awards

 Best Regional Costume - Lambayeque - Alicia Rodriguez Meza
 Miss Photogenic - Europe Perú - Ana Rosa Berninzon
 Miss Congeniality - Áncash - Jaqueline Rosales
 Miss Elegance - Region Lima - Bertha Arias
.

Delegates

Amazonas - María Esther Brambilla
Áncash - Jaqueline Rosales
Apurímac - Rosa Maria Santolaya
Ayacucho - Noelia Ruiz Rojas
Cuzco - Luz Renee Chávez
Distrito Capital - Cordelia Minetti
Europe Perú - Ana Rosa Berninzon Devéscovi
Huánuco -  Ana Patrica Escalante
Ica - Maria Isabel Uribe
Junín - Carmen Alegría
Lambayeque - Alicia Rodriguez Meza

Loreto - Candelaria Rivera
Madre de Dios - Angela Manrique
Moquegua - Inés García Calderón
Pasco - Melissa Saldarriaga
Puno -  Rosario Salazar
Region Lima - Bertha Arias
San Martín - Rebeca Requena
Tacna - Nelly Amiel
Tumbes - Gloria Esquivel 
USA Perú - Jazmine Watkins

.

References 

Miss Peru
1968 in Peru
1968 beauty pageants